This is a season-by-season list of records compiled by the University of Minnesota Duluth Bulldogs men's ice hockey team.

Minnesota Duluth has won three NCAA Championship in its history, the most recent coming in 2019 (as of 2019).

Season-by-season results

Note: GP = Games played, W = Wins, L = Losses, T = Ties

* Winning percentage is used when conference schedules are unbalanced.

Footnotes

References

 
Lists of college men's ice hockey seasons in the United States
Minnesota Duluth Bulldogs ice hockey seasons